Valeriy Kyrylovych Kravchynskyi (12 December 1938 – 2001) was a Soviet and Ukrainian football defender. He spent most of his career with Desna Chernihiv the main club in Chernihiv.

Career
As a child, he played football on Leskovitsa, took part in the unofficial championships of Chernihiv among street teams. In 1953 he enrolled in the football section, whose coach was Alexander Norov. In 1958, he played for ATK Chernihiv and for Spartak Chernihiv, then he joyed to Avanhard Chernihiv where he played 31 matches.

Desna Chernihiv
In 1961 Avanhard Chernihiv, changed the name to Desna Chernihiv and Kravchinsky was appointed vice captain and in 1964 as captain. Valeriy Kravchinsky In 1965, Desna reached the 1/8 finals of the Soviet Cup, defeating 6 opponents, including the A-class teams - Shinnik and Baku's Neftyanik. Kravchinsky took part in the 1/8 Cup final against Kairat, in which Desna lost 3: 4. He considered this game to be the best in his career and in the history of Desna. In 1967 he received the title of Master of Sports of the USSR. and also in the season 1965-66 In 1968, he played 41 games and in 1969 45 games and been the most successful seasons.

After Retirement
Finished his football career in 1970. In the fall of 1970, he was invited by Oleh Bazylevych to the position of coach of the Desna team's double, but he was at this job for about a month, since after the end of the season the team was disbanded.
In 1971 he graduated from the Chernigov branch of the Kiev Polytechnic Institute and got a job at the Chernihiv Radio Instrument Plant. At this enterprise he worked as a designer, senior engineer and foreman of the precision mechanics workshop, held the positions of department head, head of the trade union committee and deputy chief engineer. Until the age of 39 he played in the factory football team "Promin". He was awarded the Order of the Badge of Honor. In the last years of his life he worked as an engineer in the research and production complex "Vector" (Exclusion Zone of the Chernobyl NPP). He died of cancer in 2000 at the age of 61.

Tributes
In 2021 In honor of the famous football player, the regional football federation has approved an annual tournament for the Valery Kravchinsky Cup among the pupils of CYSS

Honours
Desna Chernihiv
 Football Championship of Ukrainian SSR: 1968
 Football Championship of Ukrainian SSR: Runner-Up 1966

References

External links 
Profile on website 

1938 births
Soviet footballers
Footballers from Chernihiv
FC Spartak Chernihiv players
FC Desna Chernihiv players
FC Desna Chernihiv captains
FC Desna Chernihiv managers
2001 deaths
Association footballers not categorized by position